Tauramena is a town and municipality in the Department of Casanare, Colombia.

Climate
Tauramena has a tropical monsoon climate (Köppen Am) with moderate to little rainfall from December to March and heavy to very heavy rainfall from April to November.

References

Municipalities of Casanare Department